Dressler Run is a  long 1st order tributary to Anderson Creek in Clearfield County, Pennsylvania.  This is the only stream in the United States with this name.

Course 
Dressler Run rises about 0.25 miles northwest of Home Camp, Pennsylvania, and then flows southwest and turns southeast to join Anderson Creek in Du Bois Reservoir at Home Camp.

Watershed 
Dressler Run drains  of area, receives about 44.3 in/year of precipitation, has a wetness index of 421.75, and is about 49% forested.

See also 
 List of Pennsylvania Rivers

References

Watershed Maps 

Rivers of Pennsylvania
Rivers of Clearfield County, Pennsylvania